Nacaduba calauria, the dark Ceylon six-lineblue, is a species of lycaenid butterfly found in Indomalayan realm.

References

Butterflies of Asia
Butterflies of Singapore
Butterflies described in 1860
Taxa named by Baron Cajetan von Felder